The Netherlands selected their Junior Eurovision Song Contest 2013 entry through Junior Songfestival, a national selection consisting of eight songs. The winners of final which took place on 28 September 2013 were Mylène and Rosanne with the song "Double Me", achieving a total of 33 points.

Before Junior Eurovision

Junior Songfestival 2013 
The songs were split into two semi-finals which took place on the 14 and 21 September 2013. From each semi-final two sentries qualified for the final based on the decision of adult and child juries as well as televoting. The fifth entry in the final was chosen by online voting (web wildcard).

Competing entries

Table key
 Participants who qualified to the final via jury and televoting.
 Participants who qualified to the final via wildcard

Semi-final 1

Semi-final 2

Final

At Junior Eurovision 

During the running order draw, which took place on 25 November 2013 in Kyiv, Ukraine, The Netherlands were drawn to perform tenth, following Georgia and preceding Malta.

Voting

Notes

References

Junior Eurovision Song Contest
Netherlands
2013